Registration plates of the Gambia have, since 2019 have been coloured yellow or white with black lettering. To the left is the Gambia flag and the letters "GPF". The plates are in the standard European size, and feature the German FE font. The first set of letters denote the city of issue, such as BJL for Banjul.

2019-Present
From 2019 onwards, a black-on-white colour scheme was introduced. This new license plate format uses the font FE-Schrift. The flag strip at the bottom of the license plate has been removed in this version, and replaced by a flag on the top left corner of the plate. Underneath the plate, there's a 3-letter code, GPF. GPF isn't the country's standard traffic code, that would be WAG. GPF stands for The Gambia Police Force, who are responsible for issuing of the license plates.

Some of the regional codes have also changed since the previous version. The size of motorcycle plates have also changed from 19 cm x 11 cm to 24 cm x 13 cm.

1999-2019

From 1999 a white-on-black colour scheme was introduced, which is similar to an older scheme dating from before independence.  The MC in motorcycle plates was moved to the front.  This license plate 
format comes with a strip at the bottom of the plate with the colors of the Gambian flag, and a text in the center that says The Gambia. Standard plates were issued in the font Mandatory.

Regional Codes

Previous formats

1962-1982
The number plates in this series started with GA. They had 4 digits. Private vehicle plates were White on Black background. Commercial plates were red on white background. However, commercial plates had their color change in 1978, and were then issued in black on yellow.

1982-1991
The number plates in this series started with G1A. They had 4 digits. Private vehicle plates were White on Black background. Commercial plates were black on yellow background.

1991-1994
The number plates in this series started with G2A. They had 4 digits. Private vehicle plates were Black on White background. Commercial plates were black on yellow background.

1994-1999
The number plates in this series started with G3A. They had 4 digits. Private vehicle plates were Black on White background. Commercial plates were black on yellow background.

Diplomatic plates
Diplomatic plates are white-on-green.  Three letters which denote the country or organization are followed by two numbers and 'CD'.

References
Licence plates of The Gambia
Gambia Plates
Olav's Gambian licence plates

External links

Gambia
Gambia transport-related lists